Carl Purdy (1861 - 8 August 1945) was an American nurseryman, from Ukiah, California.

Career 
As a nurseryman, Purdy specialized in plants native to California. Iris purdyi (Purdy's iris), which he discovered, is named after him.  His nursery business, Carl Purdy Gardens, was continued by his children.

A collection of catalogues issued by his firm is held at the Liberty Hyde Bailey Hortorium. Ethel Z. Bailey Horticultural Catalogue Collection.

References

 A biography of Purdy by his grandson Carl Mahurin is to be found in the California Horticultural Society Journal, volume 2 issue 4, October 1941.

External links
 
 Carl Purdy Exhibition at the Mendocino Museum, and the guidebook.

1861 births
1945 deaths
American horticulturists
People from Ukiah, California